The women's vault event at the 2020 Summer Olympics was held on 25 July and 1 August 2021 at the Ariake Gymnastics Centre. Unlike other the other apparatus events, vault requires gymnasts to perform two exercises in order for results to count towards the vault final; most of the gymnasts perform only one (if they are participating in team or individual all-around) or none (if they are only participating in other apparatus). Approximately 20 gymnasts from 15 nations (of the 98 total gymnasts) competed two vaults in the qualifying round.

Rebeca Andrade of Brazil won the event for her second individual medal of the 2020 Olympics. Andrade's medal is the first gold for Brazil in women's artistic gymnastics. MyKayla Skinner of the United States earned the silver medal after originally being excluded by the two-per-country rule. South Korea's Yeo Seo-jeong finished with the bronze to earn South Korea's first medal in women's artistic gymnastics.

The medals for the competition were presented by Nawal El Moutawakel, Morocco; IOC Executive Board Member, and the medalists' bouquets were presented by Jesus Carballo, Spain; FIG Executive Committee Member.

Background 
This was the 19th appearance of the event, after making its debut at the 1952 Summer Olympics. Defending champion Simone Biles of the United States was aiming to become the first woman to defend their Olympic title since Věra Čáslavská did so in 1964 and 1968. However, Biles announced her withdrawal on 30 July due to mental health reasons, following earlier withdrawals from the team and individual all-around finals. She was replaced in the final by teammate MyKayla Skinner, who had previously been excluded due to the two-per-country rule.

Qualification

A National Olympic Committee (NOC) could enter up to 6 qualified gymnasts: a team of 4 and up to 2 specialists. A total of 98 quota places are allocated to women's gymnastics.

The 12 teams that qualify will be able to send 4 gymnasts in the team competition, for a total of 48 of the 98 quota places. The top three teams at the 2018 World Artistic Gymnastics Championships (the United States, Russia, and China) and the top nine teams (excluding those already qualified) at the 2019 World Artistic Gymnastics Championships (France, Canada, the Netherlands, Great Britain, Italy, Germany, Belgium, Japan, and Spain) earned team qualification places.

The remaining 50 quota places are awarded individually. Each gymnast can only earn one place, except that gymnasts that competed with a team that qualified are eligible to earn a second place through the 2020 All Around World Cup Series. Some of the individual events are open to gymnasts from NOCs with qualified teams, while others are not. These places are filled through various criteria based on the 2019 World Championships, the 2020 FIG Artistic Gymnastics World Cup series, continental championships, a host guarantee, and a Tripartite Commission invitation. 

Each of the 98 qualified gymnasts are eligible for the vault competition, but due to the requirement that the gymnast perform two vault exercises in the qualifying round (rather than the one needed to count for team and individual all-around events), many gymnasts do not attempt to qualify for the vault final.

The COVID-19 pandemic delayed many of the events for qualifying for gymnastics. The 2018 and 2019 World Championships were completed on time, but many of the World Cup series events were delayed into 2021.

Competition format
The top 8 qualifiers in the qualification phase (limit two per NOC) advanced to the apparatus final. For the vault, only gymnasts who performed two exercises on the vault were considered for the final; the average score of the two exercises was counted. The finalists again performed two vaults. Qualification scores were then ignored, with only final round scores (average of the two exercises) counting.

Schedule
The competition was held over two days, 25 July and 1 August. The qualifying round (for all women's gymnastics events) was the first day with the vault final on the first day of individual event finals.

Results

Qualifying

 Reserves
The reserves for the women's vault final were:
 
 
 

Only two gymnasts from each country may advance to the event final. Gymnasts who did not qualify for the final because of the quota, but had high enough scores to do so were:
  – called up after Simone Biles' withdrawal

Final

References

Women's vault
2020
Women's 2020
Women's events at the 2020 Summer Olympics